The Alpe is a river of Lower Saxony, Germany.

The Alpe is a left tributary of the Aller. It initially crosses the Dudensen Bog and flows along the edge of the Bog  and past Rethem Bog. In the 1970s it lost its natural character, it was straightened and, in places, canalised. The Steimbker Dorfgraben, a drainage ditch joining it from the left, is very heavily polluted (water quality class III–IV). The Alpe itself has a good overall water quality (class II = moderately polluted).
Before the town of Rethem the Weiße Graben ("White Ditch") joins the Alpe along with the Wölpe. In Rethem the Alpe then discharges into the Aller.

See also 
List of rivers of Lower Saxony

References 

Rivers of Lower Saxony
Rivers of Germany